Siwinqani (Aymara siwinqa a kind of cactus, -ni a suffix, "the one with the siwinqa plant", also spelled Sivingani) is a mountain in the Bolivian Andes which reaches a height of approximately  high . It is located in the Cochabamba Department, Mizque Province, Alalay Municipality.

References 

Mountains of Cochabamba Department